The Hacienda Casa del Francés, near Esperanza on the island of Vieques, Puerto Rico, also known as Sportsmen's House, was a plantation house built in 1910. It was listed on the National Register of Historic Places in 1977.

It was the home of French sugar plantation owner Henri Muraille. It is notable as the only historic plantation residence on the island of Vieques, and one of few surviving in the Commonwealth of Puerto Rico. It later became a "parador" or inn. The house was destroyed by fire in 2005, and a lack of detailed historic documentation has prevented any faithful reconstruction.

See also
National Register of Historic Places listings in Vieques, Puerto Rico

References

Houses on the National Register of Historic Places in Puerto Rico
Vieques, Puerto Rico
Houses completed in 1910
Sugar plantations in the Caribbean
Francés
Hotel buildings on the National Register of Historic Places in Puerto Rico
Burned buildings and structures
Demolished but still listed on the National Register of Historic Places
1910 establishments in Puerto Rico
Sugar industry in Puerto Rico